Jerome Wayne "Jerry" Hendren (November 4, 1947 – February 26, 2018) was an American football player, a wide receiver who played one season in the National Football League, with the Denver Broncos

Early years
Born and raised in Spokane, Washington, Hendren graduated from its Shadle Park High School  and played college football at the University of Idaho  He led the NCAA in 1969 in both receptions (95) and receiving yards   Hendren also led the nation in 1968 in receptions (86) and receiving touchdowns (14). He was recruited to Idaho under head coach Steve Musseau;  took over in 1968 and emphasized the 

Denver Broncos

After football
After his pro football career, Hendren coached  then had a long career in law enforcement; his father Wayne was a police officer in Spokane and was the city's chief of police for a decade  Hendren worked for the Spokane County sheriff’s department for 29 years: eleven years as a patrol deputy, seven years as an undercover officer, and eleven years as an investigator.  Thomas is a captain in the Spokane Police 

In 2013, Hendren was selected by the Big Sky Conference 42nd on the conference's list of "50 Greatest Male  He was a charter member of the University of Idaho Athletics Hall of Fame 

Hendren died at age 70 in 2018.

See also
 List of college football yearly receiving leaders

References

External links
University of Idaho Athletics – Hall of Fame – Jerry Hendren
Gem of the Mountains: 1969 University of Idaho yearbook – 1968 football season
 

1947 births
2018 deaths
American football wide receivers
Idaho Vandals football players
Denver Broncos players
Players of American football from Spokane, Washington